Pine Grove Cemetery is a cemetery whose main entrance is on Boston Street in Lynn, Massachusetts. It was established in the mid-19th century and it consists of 82 developed acres. There are approximately 88,000 to 90,000 interments at the cemetery.

History
It was originally established as a private cemetery in 1849, with a design by Henry A. S. Dearborn, noted designer of Mount Auburn Cemetery in Cambridge, Massachusetts.  It was purchased by the city of Lynn in 1855. In 1930, a wall was built by the WPA to surround the cemetery, and according to Ripley's Believe It or Not! it is the “second-longest contiguous stone wall in the world,” second only to the Great Wall of China . The cemetery got its name from the plethora of pine trees surrounding Rhodes Memorial Chapel and the cemetery's entrance.  The cemetery was listed on the National Register of Historic Places in 2014.

Features and landmarks
Pine Grove Cemetery has many notable features and landmarks:
The cemetery office building, erected in 1860.
The Pine Grove Cemetery Receiving Tomb, constructed from 1866 to 1868. Built in a Ruskinian Gothic style, it was part of a building campaign following the Civil War. It is made of granite ashlar construction with a cast iron doorway.
The Rhodes Memorial Chapel, built in 1891. It was built using a donation from a Ms. Amos Rhodes in a Richardsonian Romanesque style. The stained glass windows are valued at over $10,000.
The Cemetery's greenhouse, whose operations have been noted throughout the country.

Notable interments
John G. B. Adams
Harry Agganis
Frank D. Allen
John Alley
Alice Ives Breed
Daisy Davis
Alonzo G. Draper, brigadier general during the American Civil War
Benjamin Franklin Falls
 Barney Gilligan, early professional baseball player
Henry Lovering
Lydia Pinkham
William Poole
Elihu Thomson
Charles Herbert Woodbury
Holman K. Wheeler

See also
National Register of Historic Places listings in Lynn, Massachusetts

References

External links
City page on Pine Grove Cemetery

Buildings and structures in Lynn, Massachusetts
Cemeteries in Essex County, Massachusetts
National Register of Historic Places in Lynn, Massachusetts
Historic districts on the National Register of Historic Places in Massachusetts
Cemeteries established in the 1840s
1849 establishments in Massachusetts